Rocco Mauer is former professional rugby player played for the USA Sevens rugby team on the World Rugby Sevens Series. 

He was also a member of the USA Sevens team, which won bronze in the 2011 Pan American Games. He signed a full-time training contract with USA Rugby in January 2012. Mauer's ultimate goal is to play for the US national rugby sevens team at the 2016 Olympics.

Mauer had a brief stint with the Chicago Lions club before become a full-time USA player.

College and youth career
Mauer is a former standout rugby player for Bowling Green and 2010 Midwest All-Star Sevens team selection. Mauer was named to Collegiate All-Americans and Collegiate All-American Sevens team in 2011.  Mauer was also the tournament MVP of the inaugural 2010 Collegiate Rugby Championship, leading the tournament with 11 tries scored.  Mauer graduated from Bowling Green in December 2011 with a degree in psychology and political science.

Mauer did not play rugby before college, instead he played four years of high school football and one year of college football.

See also
 United States national rugby sevens team
 IRB Sevens World Series
 Collegiate Rugby Championship

References

American rugby union players
1988 births
Living people
United States international rugby sevens players
Pan American Games medalists in rugby sevens
Pan American Games bronze medalists for the United States
Rugby sevens players at the 2011 Pan American Games
Medalists at the 2011 Pan American Games